The 2016–17 Northern Illinois Huskies men's basketball team represented Northern Illinois University during the 2016–17 NCAA Division I men's basketball season. The Huskies, led by sixth-year head coach Mark Montgomery, played their home games at the Convocation Center in DeKalb, Illinois as members of the West Division of the Mid-American Conference. They finished the season 15–17, 7–11 in MAC play to finish in a tie for eighth place. As the No. 9 seed in the MAC tournament, they lost in the first round to Eastern Michigan.

Previous season
The Huskies finished the 2015–16 season 21–13, 9–9 in MAC play to finish in a tie for third place in the West Division. They defeated Western Michigan in the first round of the MAC tournament before losing to Ohio in the quarterfinals. They received an invitation to the inaugural Vegas 16, which only had eight teams, and lost in the quarterfinals to UC Santa Barbara.

Preseason 
Northern Illinois was picked to finish in third place in the West Division in the MAC preseason poll. Marin Maric was selected to the West Division All-MAC preseason team.

Departures

Incoming Transfers

Recruiting class of 2016

Recruiting class of 2017

Roster

Schedule and results

|-
!colspan=9 style="background:#; color:#;"| Non-conference regular season

|-
!colspan=9 style="background:#; color:#;"| MAC regular season

|-
!colspan=9 style="background:#; color:#;"| MAC tournament

See also
 2016–17 Northern Illinois Huskies women's basketball team

References

Northern Illinois
Northern Illinois Huskies men's basketball seasons
Northern
Northern